A matchcoat or match coat is an outer garment consisting of a length of coarse woolen cloth (stroud), usually about  long, worn wrapped around the upper part of the body like a toga. Historically, they have been worn primarily by the Indigenous peoples of the Northeastern Woodlands in North America, who may still wear them as regalia or for traditional events. The matchcoat might be worn by people of either sex.  It was a common article of trade by the English and French with the peoples of several Nations.

The matchcoat was usually fastened with a belt; no buttons or pins were used. It could also serve as a blanket for sleeping.

The name "matchcoat" is a transliteration into English of an Algonquian word referring to clothing in general.

History
The original version of the matchcoat was a cloak of animal skin, often worn with the fur inside during colder weather.  During the course of the 1600s this began to be replaced by woven fabric purchased from the European settlers. In 1644 Johannes Megapolensis wrote 

During the late 1600s there was increasing use of ready-made clothing and a corresponding decline in use of matchcoats.

See also
Belted plaid

References

Native American clothing